Irene Keng (born March 9) is an American actress known for playing the role as Chunhua Lao in the legal comedy-drama television series Harry's Law and the role of Dongmei in the film Van Wilder: Freshman Year.

Career
Irene Keng studied acting and graduated from New York University Tisch School of the Arts. Born in California, Irene moved back to Los Angeles after graduating, where she continued to study acting. She was soon cast in independent films and as the principal role in television commercials for clients such as McDonald's, Sony, Walmart, and HTC. In 2019, Irene played Donna in the horror film The Curse of La Llorona.

Filmography

Film

Television

References

External links
 
 Irene Keng on Instagram
  DigitalSpy.com: 'Harry's Law' star hints at assault plot.
 Deadline Hollywood: The Good Doctor’: Hill Harper & Irene Keng Join ABC Medical Drama Pilot.
 Irene Keng on The Generasian Show

21st-century American actresses
American actresses of Chinese descent
Actresses from Los Angeles
Living people
New York University alumni
Year of birth missing (living people)